Bishop Mathew Gaffney was a Roman Catholic Bishop of Meath.

Mathew Gaffney was born in Mountnugent, Co. Cavan, on 2 January 1839. He began his studies for the priesthood at St. Finian's Seminary, Navan before going to Maynooth College and was ordained in 1864. Fr Gaffney worked as a teacher in St. Mary's College, Mullingar and he also served time as a curate in Tullamore, Co. Offaly, before becoming parish priest in Clara, Co. Offaly, Monsignor Gaffney became Vicar General of the Diocese of Meath.

In 1899 he was appointed Bishop of Meath, succeeding Bishop Nulty. During his tenure as Bishop, Gaffney oversaw the building of St. Finian's, Mullingar, where the diocesan seminary in Navan moved to, and began the development of the new Cathedral.

He retired due to ill health, in 1906, and was succeeded by Dr. Laurence Gaughran. Bishop Gaffney died in 1909, and was buried in the Franciscan Abbey at Multyfarnham, Co. Westmeath. In 2009, one hundred years after his death Bishop Gaffney was reburied in the grounds of the Cathedral of Christ the King, Mullingar.

References

Roman Catholic bishops of Meath
Alumni of St Patrick's College, Maynooth
1839 births
1909 deaths
People educated at St Finian's College